Ohanze is a city in Obingwa local government area of Abia State. It served as a major commercial center during slave trade era in Nigeria.

Notable people 
 Nkechi Ikpeazu — First Lady of Abia State
 Acho Nwakanma — former Deputy Governor of Abia State

References 

Populated places in Abia State
Villages in Igboland